The 1985–86 season was the 16th season of the Portland Trail Blazers in the National Basketball Association (NBA).  The Blazers finished 40–42, sixth in the Western Conference, qualifying for the playoffs for the fourth consecutive year.

Despite their losing record, the Blazers were the only team to defeat the eventual NBA champion Boston Celtics at the Boston Garden during the regular season; the Celtics went 40–1 at home, a record that was unmatched until the San Antonio Spurs in the 2015-16 season.

In the 1986 NBA Playoffs, the Blazers were defeated by the Denver Nuggets in their first-round, best-of-five playoff series, three games to one.

Draft picks

Note:  This is not a complete list; only the first two rounds are covered, as well as notable post-second round picks.

Roster

Regular season

Season standings

z - clinched division title
y - clinched division title
x - clinched playoff spot

Record vs. opponents

Game log

Regular season

|- align="center" bgcolor="#ccffcc"
| 1
| October 25, 1985
| Phoenix
| W 128–123 (OT)
|
|
|
| Memorial Coliseum
| 1–0
|- align="center" bgcolor="#ccffcc"
| 2
| October 27, 1985
| Golden State
| W 116–99
|
|
|
| Memorial Coliseum
| 2–0
|- align="center" bgcolor="#ffcccc"
| 3
| October 29, 1985
| @ L.A. Clippers
| L 113–119
|
|
|
| Los Angeles Memorial Sports Arena
| 2–1

|- align="center" bgcolor="#ccffcc"
| 4
| November 2, 1985
| Utah
| W 128–108
|
|
|
| Memorial Coliseum
| 3–1
|- align="center" bgcolor="#ccffcc"
| 5
| November 3, 1985
| New York
| W 110–96
|
|
|
| Memorial Coliseum
| 4–1
|- align="center" bgcolor="#ffcccc"
| 6
| November 5, 1985
| @ Houston
| L 113–127
|
|
|
| The Summit
| 4–2
|- align="center" bgcolor="#ccffcc"
| 7
| November 6, 1985
| @ Dallas
| W 111–109
|
|
|
| Reunion Arena
| 5–2
|- align="center" bgcolor="#ccffcc"
| 8
| November 8, 1985
| Seattle
| W 92–88
|
|
|
| Memorial Coliseum
| 6–2
|- align="center" bgcolor="#ccffcc"
| 9
| November 10, 1985
| Cleveland
| W 110–107
|
|
|
| Memorial Coliseum
| 7–2
|- align="center" bgcolor="#ccffcc"
| 10
| November 12, 1985
| Sacramento
| W 126–115
|
|
|
| Memorial Coliseum
| 8–2
|- align="center" bgcolor="#ffcccc"
| 11
| November 14, 1985
| @ L.A. Lakers
| L 102–114
|
|
|
| The Forum
| 8–3
|- align="center" bgcolor="#ffcccc"
| 12
| November 15, 1985
| @ Utah
| L 118–133
|
|
|
| Salt Palace Acord Arena
| 8–4
|- align="center" bgcolor="#ffcccc"
| 13
| November 17, 1985
| Milwaukee
| L 104–117
|
|
|
| Memorial Coliseum
| 8–5
|- align="center" bgcolor="#ffcccc"
| 14
| November 19, 1985
| New Jersey
| L 102–108
|
|
|
| Memorial Coliseum
| 8–6
|- align="center" bgcolor="#ccffcc"
| 15
| November 21, 1985
| @ L.A. Clippers
| W 112–108
|
|
|
| Los Angeles Memorial Sports Arena
| 9–6
|- align="center" bgcolor="#ffcccc"
| 16
| November 23, 1985
| L.A. Lakers
| L 113–130
|
|
|
| Memorial Coliseum
| 9–7
|- align="center" bgcolor="#ccffcc"
| 17
| November 24, 1985
| Houston
| W 125–118
|
|
|
| Memorial Coliseum
| 10–7
|- align="center" bgcolor="#ccffcc"
| 18
| November 27, 1985
| @ Phoenix
| W 110–93
|
|
|
| Arizona Veterans Memorial Coliseum
| 11–7
|- align="center" bgcolor="#ccffcc"
| 19
| November 29, 1985
| Chicago
| W 122–107
|
|
|
| Memorial Coliseum
| 12–7

|- align="center" bgcolor="#ffcccc"
| 20
| December 1, 1985
| San Antonio
| L 106–117
|
|
|
| Memorial Coliseum
| 12–8
|- align="center" bgcolor="#ffcccc"
| 21
| December 3, 1985
| @ Washington
| L 111–115
|
|
|
| Capital Centre
| 12–9
|- align="center" bgcolor="#ffcccc"
| 22
| December 4, 19854:30p.m. PST
| @ Atlanta
| L 98–109
| Colter (20)
| Jones (9)
| Porter (4)
| The Omni4,113
| 12–10
|- align="center" bgcolor="#ccffcc"
| 23
| December 6, 1985
| @ Boston
| W 121–103
|
|
|
| Boston Garden
| 13–10
|- align="center" bgcolor="#ffcccc"
| 24
| December 7, 1985
| @ New Jersey
| L 106–118
|
|
|
| Brendan Byrne Arena
| 13–11
|- align="center" bgcolor="#ccffcc"
| 25
| December 10, 1985
| Golden State
| W 94–92
|
|
|
| Memorial Coliseum
| 14–11
|- align="center" bgcolor="#ffcccc"
| 26
| December 11, 1985
| @ Utah
| L 111–119
|
|
|
| Salt Palace Acord Arena
| 14–12
|- align="center" bgcolor="#ccffcc"
| 27
| December 13, 1985
| @ Golden State
| W 127–124 (OT)
|
|
|
| Oakland-Alameda County Coliseum Arena
| 15–12
|- align="center" bgcolor="#ffcccc"
| 28
| December 17, 1985
| @ San Antonio
| L 118–126
|
|
|
| HemisFair Arena
| 14–14
|- align="center" bgcolor="#ffcccc"
| 29
| December 19, 1985
| @ Denver
| L 118–123
|
|
|
| McNichols Sports Arena
| 15–14
|- align="center" bgcolor="#ccffcc"
| 30
| December 21, 1985
| @ Seattle
| W 114–97
|
|
|
| Seattle Center Coliseum
| 16–14
|- align="center" bgcolor="#ccffcc"
| 31
| December 22, 1985
| Denver
| W 121–114
|
|
|
| Memorial Coliseum
| 17–14
|- align="center" bgcolor="#ccffcc"
| 32
| December 25, 1985
| L.A. Clippers
| W 121–107
|
|
|
| Memorial Coliseum
| 18–14
|- align="center" bgcolor="#ccffcc"
| 33
| December 27, 1985
| @ Dallas
| W 142–133 (OT)
|
|
|
| Reunion Arena
| 19–14
|- align="center" bgcolor="#ffcccc"
| 34
| December 28, 1985
| @ Houston
| L 108–118
|
|
|
| The Summit
| 19–15
|- align="center" bgcolor="#ccffcc"
| 35
| December 30, 1985
| San Antonio
| W 125–110
|
|
|
| Memorial Coliseum
| 20–15

|- align="center" bgcolor="#ffcccc"
| 36
| January 1, 1986
| Philadelphia
| L 119–121 (OT)
|
|
|
| Memorial Coliseum
| 20–16
|- align="center" bgcolor="#ccffcc"
| 37
| January 3, 1986
| Phoenix
| W 133–104
|
|
|
| Memorial Coliseum
| 21–16
|- align="center" bgcolor="#ccffcc"
| 38
| January 5, 1986
| Golden State
| W 136–120
|
|
|
| Memorial Coliseum
| 22–16
|- align="center" bgcolor="#ffcccc"
| 39
| January 8, 1986
| @ L.A. Lakers
| L 121–125
|
|
|
| The Forum
| 22–17
|- align="center" bgcolor="#ffcccc"
| 40
| January 10, 1986
| @ Milwaukee
| L 89–95
|
|
|
| MECCA Arena
| 22–18
|- align="center" bgcolor="#ccffcc"
| 41
| January 11, 1986
| @ New York
| W 109–106
|
|
|
| Madison Square Garden
| 23–18
|- align="center" bgcolor="#ccffcc"
| 42
| January 14, 1986
| @ Cleveland
| W 120–108
|
|
|
| Richfield Coliseum
| 24–18
|- align="center" bgcolor="#ccffcc"
| 43
| January 15, 1986
| @ Indiana
| W 109–104
|
|
|
| Market Square Arena
| 25–18
|- align="center" bgcolor="#ccffcc"
| 44
| January 18, 1986
| Phoenix
| W 112–87
|
|
|
| Memorial Coliseum
| 26–18
|- align="center" bgcolor="#ffcccc"
| 45
| January 19, 1986
| San Antonio
| L 105–116
|
|
|
| Memorial Coliseum
| 26–19
|- align="center" bgcolor="#ccffcc"
| 46
| January 23, 1986
| Seattle
| W 117–107 (2OT)
|
|
|
| Memorial Coliseum
| 27–19
|- align="center" bgcolor="#ccffcc"
| 47
| January 25, 1986
| @ Sacramento
| W 129–125
|
|
|
| ARCO Arena
| 28–19
|- align="center" bgcolor="#ffcccc"
| 48
| January 26, 1986
| Sacramento
| L 116–121
|
|
|
| Memorial Coliseum
| 28–20
|- align="center" bgcolor="#ffcccc"
| 49
| January 28, 1986
| @ Phoenix
| L 130–136
|
|
|
| Arizona Veterans Memorial Coliseum
| 28–21
|- align="center" bgcolor="#ffcccc"
| 50
| January 30, 1986
| L.A. Lakers
| L 94–118
|
|
|
| Memorial Coliseum
| 28–22

|- align="center" bgcolor="#ccffcc"
| 51
| February 1, 1986
| L.A. Clippers
| W 156–121
|
|
|
| Memorial Coliseum
| 29–22
|- align="center" bgcolor="#ffcccc"
| 52
| February 4, 1986
| @ Denver
| L 118–119
|
|
|
| McNichols Sports Arena
| 29–23
|- align="center" bgcolor="#ffcccc"
| 53
| February 6, 1986
| Dallas
| L 111–115
|
|
|
| Memorial Coliseum
| 29–24
|- align="center"
|colspan="9" bgcolor="#bbcaff"|All-Star Break
|- style="background:#cfc;"
|- bgcolor="#bbffbb"
|- align="center" bgcolor="#ffcccc"
| 54
| February 11, 1986
| Washington
| L 116–124
|
|
|
| Memorial Coliseum
| 29–25
|- align="center" bgcolor="#ffcccc"
| 55
| February 13, 1986
| @ L.A. Clippers
| L 113–118
|
|
|
| Los Angeles Memorial Sports Arena
| 29–26
|- align="center" bgcolor="#ffcccc"
| 56
| February 14, 1986
| Boston
| L 119–120 (OT)
|
|
|
| Memorial Coliseum
| 29–27
|- align="center" bgcolor="#ffcccc"
| 57
| February 16, 19865:00p.m. PST
| Atlanta
| L 101–110
| Vandeweghe (21)
| Kersey, Thompson (10)
| Drexler, Paxson (6)
| Memorial Coliseum12,666
| 29–28
|- align="center" bgcolor="#ffcccc"
| 58
| February 19, 1986
| @ Philadelphia
| L 133–153
|
|
|
| The Spectrum
| 29–29
|- align="center" bgcolor="#ffcccc"
| 59
| February 21, 1986
| @ Chicago
| L 96–108
|
|
|
| Chicago Stadium
| 29–30
|- align="center" bgcolor="#ffcccc"
| 60
| February 22, 1986
| @ Detroit
| L 106–113
|
|
|
| Pontiac Silverdome
| 29–31
|- align="center" bgcolor="#ffcccc"
| 61
| February 24, 1986
| Denver
| L 113–119
|
|
|
| Memorial Coliseum
| 29–32
|- align="center" bgcolor="#ffcccc"
| 62
| February 26, 1986
| @ Phoenix
| L 112–113
|
|
|
| Arizona Veterans Memorial Coliseum
| 29–33
|- align="center" bgcolor="#ffcccc"
| 63
| February 27, 1986
| @ Seattle
| L 94–107
|
|
|
| Seattle Center Coliseum
| 29–34

|- align="center" bgcolor="#ccffcc"
| 64
| March 1, 1986
| Houston
| W 117–112
|
|
|
| Memorial Coliseum
| 30–34
|- align="center" bgcolor="#ccffcc"
| 65
| March 4, 1986
| Indiana
| W 102–99
|
|
|
| Memorial Coliseum
| 31–34
|- align="center" bgcolor="#ccffcc"
| 66
| March 7, 1986
| Dallas
| W 125–114
|
|
|
| Memorial Coliseum
| 32–34
|- align="center" bgcolor="#ccffcc"
| 67
| March 8, 1986
| Utah
| W 104–90
|
|
|
| Memorial Coliseum
| 33–34
|- align="center" bgcolor="#ffcccc"
| 68
| March 13, 1986
| @ Houston
| L 118–126
|
|
|
| The Summit
| 33–35
|- align="center" bgcolor="#ffcccc"
| 69
| March 14, 1986
| @ Dallas
| L 118–129
|
|
|
| Reunion Arena
| 33–36
|- align="center" bgcolor="#ccffcc"
| 70
| March 16, 1986
| Detroit
| W 119–109
|
|
|
| Memorial Coliseum
| 34–36
|- align="center" bgcolor="#ffcccc"
| 71
| March 18, 1986
| @ L.A. Lakers
| L 122–128
|
|
|
| The Forum
| 34–37
|- align="center" bgcolor="#ccffcc"
| 72
| March 21, 1986
| Seattle
| W 115–108
|
|
|
| Memorial Coliseum
| 35–37
|- align="center" bgcolor="#ccffcc"
| 73
| March 23, 1986
| Sacramento
| W 112–102
|
|
|
| Memorial Coliseum
| 36–37
|- align="center" bgcolor="#ffcccc"
| 74
| March 25, 1986
| @ Sacramento
| L 99–116
|
|
|
| ARCO Arena
| 36–38
|- align="center" bgcolor="#ffcccc"
| 75
| March 29, 1986
| @ Golden State
| L 129–130
|
|
|
| Oakland-Alameda County Coliseum Arena
| 36–39

|- align="center" bgcolor="#ccffcc"
| 76
| April 1, 1986
| Denver
| W 127–110
|
|
|
| Memorial Coliseum
| 37–39
|- align="center" bgcolor="#ccffcc"
| 77
| April 2, 1986
| @ Seattle
| W 121–109
|
|
|
| Seattle Center Coliseum
| 38–39
|- align="center" bgcolor="#ffcccc"
| 78
| April 5, 1986
| @ Utah
| L 103–114
|
|
|
| Salt Palace Acord Arena
| 38–40
|- align="center" bgcolor="#ffcccc"
| 79
| April 8, 1986
| L.A. Lakers
| L 114–120
|
|
|
| Memorial Coliseum
| 38–41
|- align="center" bgcolor="#ccffcc"
| 80
| April 10, 1986
| L.A. Clippers
| W 115–100
|
|
|
| Memorial Coliseum
| 39–41
|- align="center" bgcolor="#ccffcc"
| 81
| April 11, 1986
| @ Golden State
| W 131–130
|
|
|
| Oakland-Alameda County Coliseum Arena
| 40–41
|- align="center" bgcolor="#ffcccc"
| 82
| April 13, 1986
| @ San Antonio
| L 118–123
|
|
|
| HemisFair Arena
| 40–42

Playoffs

|- align="center" bgcolor="#ffcccc"
| 1
| April 18, 1986
| @ Denver
| L 126–133
| Kiki VanDeWeghe (28)
| Kenny Carr (9)
| Steve Colter (6)
| McNichols Sports Arena13,209
| 0–1
|- align="center" bgcolor="#ccffcc"
| 2
| April 20, 1986
| @ Denver
| W 108–106
| Kiki VanDeWeghe (36)
| Kenny Carr (11)
| Clyde Drexler (8)
| McNichols Sports Arena11,724
| 1–1
|- align="center" bgcolor="#ffcccc"
| 3
| April 22, 1986
| Denver
| L 104–115
| Kiki VanDeWeghe (24)
| Kenny Carr (15)
| Clyde Drexler (7)
| Memorial Coliseum12,666
| 1–2
|- align="center" bgcolor="#ffcccc"
| 4
| April 24, 1986
| Denver
| L 112–116
| Kiki VanDeWeghe (18)
| Kenny Carr (18)
| Steve Colter (8)
| Memorial Coliseum12,666
| 1–3
|-

Player statistics

Season

Playoffs

Awards and honors
 Clyde Drexler, NBA All-Star
 Clyde Drexler, NBA Player of the Week (December  30–January  5)

Transactions

References

Portland Trail Blazers seasons
Portland Trail Blazers 1985
Portland Trail Blazers 1986
Port
Portland
Portland